Hameer is an Indian Gujarati romantic action thriller film produced by Rashmin Majithia, written and directed by Ashok Patel. Starring Hiten Kumar, Yashpal Sharma, Mohan Joshi and Chandni Chopra, it is a revenge story of a common farmer’s family. The Bhojpuri superstar Ravi Kishan made his Gujarati debut with this feature film released on 13 January 2017.

Plot 
The film Hameer is a revenge story of how a common farmer Veersingh’s family fights the tyranny of a vicious villain Hameer.

Cast 
 Hiten Kumar as Ismail Khan
 Ravi Kishan as Veersingh/ Raghuveer
 Chandni Chopra as Kesar
 Yashpal Sharma as Hameer
 Mohan Joshi as Jashwant
Komal Thacker as Shakila
 Dhawan Mewada as Rahul
 Rana Jang Bahadur as P.S.I.Ramprasad
 Guru Patel as Rocky
 Riya Mehta as Kajal
 Rakesh Pujara as Zoravar
 Heena Rajput as Janaki
 Scarlett Mellish Wilson as item number "Tapka Doon"

Production

Development 
After announcing the film on 1 May 2016, Rashmin Majithia and Coconut Motion Pictures started the production work of their first Gujarati film on 14 May. The film is written and directed by Ashok Patel.
Keerthi Sagathia directed the music for Hameer, while singers like Keerthi Sagathia, Kirtidan Gadhvi, Rekha Bhardwaj, Aishwarya Majumdar, Namrata Karwa, Sana, Aditi Pal, Nisha Upadhyay, Nitin Barot, and Chinmay gave their voice for this movie’s songs.

Filming 
The film was set and shot in Palanpur, Idar, Polo forest, and some other locations in Gujarat.

Casting 
Leading names from Gujarati, Bhojpuri and Indian film industry such as Ravi Kishan, Hiten Kumar, Yashpal Sharma and Chandni Chopra signed the film, playing the lead-roles. Mohan Joshi, Komal Thacker, Dhawan Mewada, Rana Jang Bahadur, Guru Patel, Riya Mehta, Heena Rajput, and Rakesh Pujara roped in for the supporting roles in the movie.

Soundtrack 
Music for the film is directed by Keerthi Sagathia, and the lyrics are written by Ashok Patel. On the music launch event organized on 6 January 2017, Zen Music Gujarati released the below soundtracks.

References

External links 

2017 films
Indian action thriller films
Films shot in Gujarat
Films set in Gujarat
Films directed by Ashok Patel
Films produced by Rashmin Majithia
Films scored by Keerthi Sagathia
2010s Gujarati-language films
2017 action thriller films